Rhynchopyga discalba is a species of moth in the subfamily Arctiinae. It was described by William James Kaye in 1918.

References

Moths described in 1918
Euchromiina